The following is the qualification system and qualified athletes, countries and teams for the Baseball at the 2023 Central American and Caribbean Games competitions.

Qualification system 
As host nation, El Salvador qualifies a team with 24 athletes automatically. The WSBC ranking will determine the next 4 classified teams. The champion and runner-up of the Caribbean Baseball Cup, Bahamas 2022 (COCABE) will receive their quota automatically. The champion of the 2023 Centroamericano de Beisbol	 will receive the last slot.

Qualification timeline

Qualification summary

Qualified Teams

References 

P
Qualification for the 2023 Central American and Caribbean Games